Marmara smilacisella is a species of moth of the family Gracillariidae. It is known from the United States (Kentucky and Ohio south to Florida and Texas).

The larvae feed on Smilax glabra, Smilax glauca and Smilax hispida. They mine the upper side of the leaves, making a silvery white narrow mine. There is a narrow central line of frass. The mines wind about over the leaf, crossing and recrossing and in smaller leaves involving almost the whole upper surface. At maturity, the larvae turn bright red, emerge from the mine, and, in a fold under the edge of the leaf, spin yellowish white cocoons to pupate.

References

Gracillariinae